Viktor Gushchinskiy (born 12 August 1978) is a Russian triple jumper.

He finished sixth at the 2001 Summer Universiade and seventh at the 2004 Olympic Games. He later competed at the 2005 World Championships and the 2006 World Indoor Championships without reaching the final.

His personal best jump is 17.22 metres, achieved in July 2004 in Tula. He has 17.33 metres on the indoor track, achieved in February 2006 in Samara.

References 

1978 births
Living people
Russian male triple jumpers
Olympic male triple jumpers
Olympic athletes of Russia
Athletes (track and field) at the 2004 Summer Olympics
Competitors at the 2001 Summer Universiade
World Athletics Championships athletes for Russia
Russian Athletics Championships winners
21st-century Russian people